is a Japanese former professional footballer who played as a forward. He played for the Japan national team.

Club career
Maki was a key player for Komazawa University in Tokyo along with Masaki Fukai. After graduating from Komazawa University in 2003, Maki joined JEF United Ichihara (later JEF United Chiba). He made his first professional appearance on 22 March 2003 against Tokyo Verdy. He scored his first professional goal on 2 August 2003 against Urawa Reds. For his first year at JEF, he was often used as a second-half substitute. However, in 2005 he became a starting forward for the team. JEF won the champions in 2005 and 2006 J.League Cup. However many players left the club and the club results were sluggish late 2000s. JEF finished at the bottom place in 2009 season and was relegated to J2 League first time in the club history. His opportunity to play decreased for generational change in 2010.

In July 2010, Maki moved to Russian Premier League club FC Amkar Perm. In March 2011, he moved to Chinese Super League club Shenzhen Ruby. However he could not play many matches in both clubs. In August 2011, he returned to Japan and signed with J2 League club Tokyo Verdy. He played many matches as mainly substitute forward in three seasons. In 2014, he moved to his local club Roasso Kumamoto. He played more than 30 matches as mainly substitute forward every season. However his opportunity to play decreased in 2018 and Roasso was relegated to J3 League end of 2018 season. He retired end of 2018 season.

International career
Maki represented Japan in the 2001 Summer Universiade in Beijing, contributing to their championship win by scoring 3 goals in the tournament.

In July 2005, Maki was selected Japan national team for 2005 East Asian Football Championship. At this tournament, he debuted against North Korea on 31 July. In 2006, he was selected for Japan's World Cup squad and started a match against Brazil. He was a member of the Japan team for the 2007 Asian Cup finals and played four games. He scored two goals in the tournament, both against Vietnam. He played 38 games and scored 8 goals for Japan until 2009.

Personal life
Maki married former actress Tomoko Kitagawa (ja) in June 2007. His younger brother Yuki is also a former footballer. His younger sister Karina is a former handball player.

Career statistics

Club

International

Scores and results list Japan's goal tally first, score column indicates score after each Maki goal.

References

External links

Japan National Football Team Database

Profile at Roasso Kumamoto

1980 births
Living people
Komazawa University alumni
People from Uki, Kumamoto
Association football people from Kumamoto Prefecture
Japanese footballers
Japan international footballers
J1 League players
J2 League players
Russian Premier League players
Chinese Super League players
JEF United Chiba players
FC Amkar Perm players
Shenzhen F.C. players
Tokyo Verdy players
Roasso Kumamoto players
2006 FIFA World Cup players
2007 AFC Asian Cup players
Japanese expatriate footballers
Expatriate footballers in Russia
Expatriate footballers in China
Japanese expatriate sportspeople in Russia
Japanese expatriate sportspeople in China
Association football forwards